Mike Palm (February 13, 1925 – July 24, 2011) was a relief pitcher in Major League Baseball who played briefly for the Boston Red Sox during the  season. Listed at 6' 3", 190 lb., he batted and threw right-handed.

Born in Boston, Massachusetts, Palm is one of relatively few Red Sox players to have been born in the city of Boston. He was christened Richard Paul, but later legally changed his name to Mike.

Following his discharge after serving in World War II, Palm pitched in the minor leagues from 1946 to 1948 before joining the Red Sox late in 1948. In three relief appearances, he posted a 6.00 earned run average with one strikeout and five walks in 3.0 innings of work. He did not have a decision or saves.

Palm later played three years in the minors, retiring in 1951. In a seven-season career, he had a 54–43 record and a 3.75 ERA in 152 pitching appearances.

After leaving baseball, Palm started a career in the printing business working for several different firms until he started his own corporation, Palm Associates, where he worked until his retirement in the 1990s. In 2011, he was inducted into the Belmont High School Hall of Fame for his outstanding pitching record and performance while playing baseball, averaging 18 strikeouts per game. He also was the recipient of many awards his senior year including the Boston Post All Scholastic Award in 1943, one of the highest honors given in high school baseball at the time.

Palm was a long-time resident of Scituate, Massachusetts, where he died at the age of 86.

See also
1948 Boston Red Sox season

References

External links
Retrosheet

1925 births
2011 deaths
Allentown Wings players
Belmont High School (Massachusetts) alumni
Baseball players from Massachusetts
Birmingham Barons players
Boston Red Sox players
Louisville Colonels (minor league) players
Major League Baseball pitchers
Roanoke Red Sox players
Sacramento Solons players
United States Army Air Forces personnel of World War II